USS Content (SP-538) was a motorboat that served in the United States Navy as a patrol vessel from 1917 to 1919.

Content was built in 1912 at Port Clinton, Ohio as the civilian pleasure craft Dolph II. She was later renamed Content.

After the United States entered World War I, the U.S. Navy chartered Content for use as a patrol vessel. She was commissioned as USS Content (SP-538) on 22 May 1917. She was assigned to the 1st Naval District, where she patrolled in defense of coastal waters in northern New England through the end of the war.

Content was decommissioned on 30 January 1919. On 3 February 1919 she was returned to her owner.

References

Department of the Navy: Naval Historical Center: Online Library of Selected Images: U.S. Navy Ships: USS Content (SP-538), 1917–1919. Previously the civilian motor boat Dolph II (1912) and Content
NavSource Online: Section Patrol Craft Photo Archive Content (SP 538)

Patrol vessels of the United States
World War I patrol vessels of the United States
Ships built in Port Clinton, Ohio
1912 ships